Tim Peters is an American software developer who is known for creating the Timsort hybrid sorting algorithm and for his major contributions to the Python programming language and its original CPython implementation. A pre-1.0 CPython user, he was among the group of early adopters who contributed to the detailed design of the language in its early stages.

He later created the Timsort algorithm (based on earlier work on the use of "galloping" search) which has been used in Python since version 2.3, as well as in other widely used computing platforms, including the V8 JavaScript engine powering the Google Chrome and Chromium web browsers, as well as Node.js. He has also contributed the doctest and timeit modules to the Python standard library.

Peters also wrote the Zen of Python, intended as a statement of Python's design philosophy, which was incorporated into the official Python literature as Python Enhancement Proposal 20 and in the Python interpreter as an easter egg. He contributed the chapter on algorithms to the Python Cookbook. From 2001 to 2014 he was active as a member of the Python Software Foundation's board of directors. Peters was an influential contributor to Python mailing lists. He is also a highly ranked contributor to Stack Overflow, mostly for answers relating to Python.

Peters' past employers include Kendall Square Research.

Tim Peters was granted the Python Software Foundation's Distinguished Service Award for 2017.

See also 
 History of Python

References/Notes and references

External links 
 PyCon 2006 interview with Tim Peters
 Stack Overflow user page
 PythonLabs.com

Python (programming language) people
Computer programmers
Free software programmers
Living people
Year of birth missing (living people)